Kyriacos  is a Greek male given name, which means "of the lord" (derived from Greek κύριος (kyrios) "lord"). Examples of people with this name include:

Kyriacos Costa Nicolaou (born 1946), Cypriot-American chemist known for synthesizing Taxol
Kyriacos A. Athanasiou (born 1960), bioengineer
Kyriacos C. Markides, (born 1942), professor of sociology, University of Maine
Kyriacos Chailis (born 1978), Cypriot striker
Kyriacos Kyriacou (born 1989), Cypriot defender
Kyriacos Pavlou, (born 1986), Cypriot midfielder
Kyriacos Triantaphyllides (born 1944), Cypriot politician and Member of the European Parliament
Kyriacos Mitsotakis, Greek politician and current Prime Minister of Greece (born 1968)

See also 
Cyriacus (disambiguation) for uses of the Latinized form
Kyrie
Kuriakose